Salvia austriaca, or Austrian sage, is a native of high altitudes across Russia and eastern Europe. The plant has a basal rosette of leaves 1 m across, which give off a fetid odor when brushed. The individual leaves are approx. 30 cm long, with indented midrib and veins. The flower stalk grows 60 cm or more above the foliage, with pale yellow flowers in whorls of six or more that make an inflorescence 20–25 cm long.

References

austriaca
Flora of Austria
Flora of Belarus
Flora of Bulgaria
Flora of Czechoslovakia
Flora of Hungary
Flora of Romania
Flora of South European Russia
Flora of the Crimean Peninsula
Flora of Ukraine
Flora of Yugoslavia